"Two Months Off" is the first single by Underworld from the album A Hundred Days Off, originally released in 2002.  This track was one of the first songs that they released as a duo.  The single peaked on the UK Singles Chart at number 12 as well as number two for three weeks on the US dance chart.

A short spoken word vocal section can be heard above the track lead-in. The contributing artist for these vocals is Juanita Boxill, whose voice also features in "Little Speaker", track 5 of A Hundred Days Off.

Boxill is the namesake of separate Underworld single Juanita / Kiteless / To Dream of Love.

Track listing

CD: Junior Boy's Own, JBO5020093 (UK) Part 1/2 
 "Two Months Off (Radio Edit)" – 3:58
 "Two Months Off (King Unique Sunspots Vocal Mix)" – 8:17
 "Headset" – 5:58

CD: Junior Boy's Own, JBO5020098 (UK) Part 2/2 
 "Two Months Off" – 9:09
 "Two Months Off (John Ciafone Vocal Remix)" – 7:32
 "Tiny Clicks" – 2:13

CD: Junior Boy's Own, JBO5020818 (SE) 
 "Two Months Off (Radio Edit)" – 3:58
 "Two Months Off (King Unique Sunspots Vocal Mix)" – 8:17

CD: Junior Boy's Own, JBO5020813 (EU) 
 "Two Months Off (Radio Edit)" – 3:58
 "Two Months Off (King Unique Sunspots Vocal Mix)" – 8:17
 "Two Months Off (John Ciafone Vocal Remix)" – 7:32
 "Two Months Off" – 9:09

CD: V2, V2A0009 (AU) 
 "Two Months Off (Radio Edit)" – 3:58
 "Two Months Off (King Unique Sunspots Vocal Mix)" – 8:17
 "Two Months Off (John Ciafone Vocal Remix)" – 7:32
 "Tiny Clicks" – 2:13
 "Headset" – 5:58

CD: V2, V2CP 141 (JP) 
 "Two Months Off (Radio Edit)" – 3:58
 "Two Months Off" – 9:09
 "Two Months Off (John Ciafone Vocal Remix)" – 7:32
 "Tiny Clicks" – 2:13
 "Two Months Off (King Unique Sunspots Vocal Mix)" – 8:17
 "Headset" – 5:58

CD: Junior Boy's Own, JBO5020093P (UK) promo 
 "Two Months Off (Radio Edit)" – 3:58

12": Junior Boy's Own, JBO5020096 (UK) 
 "Two Months Off" – 9:09
 "Two Months Off (King Unique Sunspots Vocal Mix)" – 8:17

12": Junior Boy's Own, JBO5020090 (UK) 
 "Two Months Off (John Ciafone Vocal Remix)" – 7:32
 "Two Months Off (John Ciafone Vocal Mix 2)" – 7:00

12": Junior Boy's Own, JBO5020096P (UK) promo; V2, V2AB-27753-1 (US) promo  
 "Two Months Off" – 9:09

12": Junior Boy's Own, JBO5020090P (UK) promo 
 "Two Months Off (King Unique Sunspots Vocal Mix)" – 8:17
 "Two Months Off (John Ciafone Vocal Remix)" – 7:32

Appearances
A stripped down and slightly sonically reworked version of the song's bridge features in And I Will Kiss and Caliban's Dream, songs written by Smith for the 2012 Summer Olympics opening ceremony.

A cover of the song by Techno Masters was featured in Dance Dance Revolution SuperNova 2, a music video game produced by Konami.

The King Unique mix is featured in EA Sports FIFA Football 2004's soundtrack.

Charts

References

External links
Underworldlive.com
Discogs

Underworld (band) songs
2002 singles
UK Independent Singles Chart number-one singles
2002 songs
Songs written by Rick Smith (musician)
Songs written by Karl Hyde